Aeneas Evan "Red, Reddy" McMillan (June 20, 1881 – June 18, 1960) was a professional ice hockey and lacrosse player. He played with the Cobalt Silver Kings of the National Hockey Association. He also played hockey in his hometown with the Cornwall Seniors of the Ontario Hockey Association, and in the IHL with Pittsburgh and Calumet. He is a member of the Cornwall Sports Hall of Fame. He died on June 18, 1960.

References

External links
Red McMillan at JustSportsStats

1881 births
1960 deaths
Ice hockey people from Ontario
Calumet Miners players
Cobalt Silver Kings players
Pittsburgh Professionals players
Sportspeople from Cornwall, Ontario
Canadian ice hockey left wingers